Jie or JIE may refer to:

 Jie of Xia, last ruler of the Xia Dynasty of China
 Jie Zhitui or Zitui (7th centuryBC), a famed minister of Zhou China
 Jie (ethnic group), tribe in the Xiongnu Confederation in the 4th and 5th centuries
 Jie (Uganda), an ethnic group of Ugandan pastoralists
 Jiedao, subdistrict, an administrative division in China
 Yu Jie, Chinese author
 Journal of Interdisciplinary Economics (JIE)
 Journées Information Eaux (JIE), a French congress about water
 Mispronunciation of Xie (surname 解)